Nisha Aggarwal is a former Indian actress and model who appeared in Telugu, Malayalam and Tamil films. She is the younger sister of actress Kajal Aggarwal.

Early life
Aggarwal was born and brought up in a Punjabi family settled in Mumbai (present-day Mumbai). Her father Suman Aggarwal, is an entrepreneur in the textile business and her mother Vinay Aggarwal is a confectioner, and her sister's business manager. She has an elder sister Kajal Aggarwal, an actress in Telugu, Tamil and Hindi cinema.

Personal life
Aggarwal married a Mumbai-based businessman Karan Valecha, who is the owner of Gold's gym chain  on 28 December 2013.
On 27 October 2017, she gave birth to their son, Ishaan Valecha.

Career
In late 2010, Kajal Aggarwal announced that Nisha would make her acting debut in Telugu films. Nisha had been travelling with her elder sister to the shooting sets and soon got noticed. Her first Telugu film, she said, happened after the director saw stills of her in a magazine. Her first film was the romantic drama, Yemaindi Ee Vela, which was a box office success. Her performance was praised by critics. Her next film was Solo, which released in late 2011 and featured her as a medical college student, with a reviewer from Rediff stating that she "proves her acting talents in the second half, especially the climax".

She made her debut in Tamil with the film Ishtam (2012), a remake of Yemaindi Ee Vela, which was a box office failure. She appeared as a "chatpata village girl" in 2013 opposite Aadi and Bhavna Ruparel in Sukumarudu. Later that year she starred in a film titled Saradaga Ammayitho that saw her pairing with her Yemaindi Ee Vela co-star Varun Sandesh again. In 2014, she entered the Malayalam film industry with Bhaiyya Bhaiyya, playing Angel, an "educated and headstrong girl", who is the daughter of an ex-minister. She then appeared in another Malayalam film, Cousins.

Filmography

References

External links
 
 

Living people
21st-century Indian actresses
Actresses from Mumbai
Actresses in Tamil cinema
Actresses in Telugu cinema
Female models from Mumbai
Indian film actresses
Actresses in Malayalam cinema
Year of birth missing (living people)